Mark Bolsterli (October 3, 1930, New Haven, Connecticut – May 19, 2012, Santa Fe, New Mexico) was an American theoretical physicist, specializing in nuclear physics.

Biography
Mark Bolsterli attended high school in Webster Groves, Missouri, where he became an Eagle Scout. He graduated in 1955 from Washington University in St. Louis with a Ph.D. in physics. His Ph.D. thesis A perturbation procedure for bound states of nuclei was supervised by Eugene Feenberg. Bolsterli received a Fulbright Scholarship to England for the academic year 1955–1956, a fellowship to the Niels Bohr Institute for the academic year 1961–1962, and a Guggenheim Fellowship to the University of Oxford for the academic year 1964–1965. At the University of Minnesota he was a professor from 1959 to 1969. He was a staff member of the Theoretical Physics Division of Los Alamos National Laboratory from 1969 to 1991, when he retired.

Bosterli did research on the structure of atomic nuclei and mathematical physics. He was elected in 1963 a Fellow of the American Physical Society.

His first wife, Margaret Jones Bolsterli, whom he met in the early 1950s when they were both graduate students at Washington University in St. Louis, became a well-known author. They had two sons, Eric (born 1957), and David (1959–2019). During the 1960s, Mark Bolsterli and his first wife divorced. In 1971, he met Judith "Judy" Costlow (born 1946) when they were skiing in the Santa Fe Ski Basin. They married and over the years of their marriage they "skied, hiked, and bicycled in many parts of the world." Mark and Judy Costlow in 1976 bicycled from Missoula, Montana to Yellowstone National Park and then to Jackson Hole, Wyoming. In 2007 the couple went on a bicycle tour from Bariloche, Argentina to Puerto Montt, Chile.

Mark Bolsterli died in 2019 from complications of Parkinson's disease.

Selected publications
 
  (over 400 citations)
 
 
 
 
 
 
 
 
 
 
  1971

References

External links
 

1930 births
2012 deaths
20th-century American physicists
21st-century American physicists
American nuclear physicists
Washington University in St. Louis alumni
University of Minnesota faculty
Los Alamos National Laboratory personnel
Fellows of the American Physical Society